Posyolok imeni Gorkogo is a rural locality (a settlement) and the administrative center of Vakhromeyevskoye Rural Settlement, Kameshkovsky District, Vladimir Oblast, Russia. The population was 2,342 as of 2010. There are 17 streets.

Geography 
The settlement is located 18 km north of Kameshkovo (the district's administrative centre) by road. Vakhromeyevo is the nearest rural locality.

References 

Rural localities in Kameshkovsky District